Panares was a Greek general (strategos) of the ancient Cretan city of Kydonia in 69 BC at the time when the Romans attacked the city. Kydonia had aligned itself with the interests of pirates and incurred the anger of the Roman Senate. The Romans commissioned the praetor Marcus Antonius to take care of the Pirate Problem in the Mediterranean. In 69 BC, he besieged Kydonia. When the Romans vanquished Kydonia, Panares surrendered the city, while his fellow strategos, Lasthenes, fled to Knossos.

References

Citations

Sources
Appianus of Alexandria and Horace White. The Roman History of Appian of Alexandria, Macmillan Company, 1899.
Hogan, C. Michael. "Cydonia". Modern Antiquarian, January 23, 2008.
Mommsen, Theodor and William Purdie Dickson (trans.). The History of Rome, 1894.

1st-century BC Greek people
Ancient Cretan generals
Roman Crete
Ancient Greek pirates
Ancient Cydonians